Jan Buys may refer to:

 Joannes Busaeus (1547–1611), theologian
 Jan Brandts Buys (1868–1933), composer
 Jan Buijs (1889–1961), architect